Héloïse Suzanne Colin (1819–1873), also known as Héloïse Leloir, was a painter and fashion illustrator during the Second French Empire.

Biography 
Héloïse Colin was the eldest daughter of painter Alexandre-Marie Colin and Marie Joseph Juhel. She married Auguste Leloir with whom she had two sons: the illustrator Maurice Leloir and the painter Alexandre-Louis Leloir.

Colin exhibited her first drawings in the 1835 edition of the Salon. She painted watercolors, miniatures, and illustrations for novels, such as The Three Musketeers and The Count of Monte Cristo. However, she and her sisters Anaïs Toudouze and Laure Noël were best known for their work as illustrators of Parisian fashion of the mid-nineteenth, such as in the famous fashion magazine La Mode Illustrée.

References

External links 
Héloïse Colin on Data.bnf.fr 
Works by Héloïse Leloir-Colin held by the Rijksmuseum
Works by Hélöise Leloir held by the Metropolitan Museum of Art

19th-century French painters
Fashion illustrators
Painters from Paris
1819 births
1873 deaths
19th-century French illustrators